Perkins & McWayne was an architectural partnership of Robert Perkins and Albert McWayne.

A number of its works are listed on the U.S. National Register of Historic Places.

Works by either architect or the partnership include (with attribution):
Augustana College Historic Buildings, 29th and S. Summit Sts. Sioux Falls, SD (Perkins & McWayne), NRHP-listed
Codington County Courthouse (built 1929), 1st Ave., SE Watertown, SD (Freed, Perkins & McWayne), NRHP-listed
Coolidge Sylvan Theatre, Medary Ave. Brookings, SD (Perkins and McWayne Architects), NRHP-listed
Coughlin Campanile (built 1929), Medary Ave. Brookings, SD (Perkins & McWayne, Architects), NRHP-listed
Douglas County Courthouse (1927), U.S. 281 Armour, SD (Perkins, C & McWayne), NRHP-listed
Glidden-Martin Hall, 1101 W. 22nd Ave. Sioux Falls, SD (Perkins & McWayne), NRHP-listed
Jerauld County Courthouse, Jct. of South Dakota Ave. and Burrett St. Wessington Springs, SD (Perkins & McWayne), NRHP-listed
L.D. Miller Funeral Home, 507 S. Main Ave. Sioux Falls, SD (Perkins & McWayne), NRHP-listed
Pierre Masonic Lodge, 201 W. Capitol Ave. Pierre, SD (Perkins and McWayne), NRHP-listed
Redfield City Hall, Old, 517 N. Main St. Redfield, SD (Perkins & McWayne), NRHP-listed
Shriver-Johnson Building, 230 S. Phillips Ave. Sioux Falls, SD (Perkins & McWayne), NRHP-listed
Dr. Steven's House, 21 S. Riverview Heights Sioux Falls, SD (Perkins, Robert), NRHP-listed
Watertown Stadium (built 1940), 1600 W Kemp Ave. Watertown, SD (Perkins & McWayne), NRHP-listed

References

Architecture firms based in South Dakota